Inverted pyramid may refer to:

 Inverted pyramid (journalism),  a metaphor in journalism for how information should be prioritized and structured in a text
 Inverted pyramid (management), also known as a "reverse hierarchy", an organizational structure that inverts the classical pyramid of hierarchical organisations
 Inverted pyramid (architecture), a structure in the shape of an upside-down pyramid
 La Pyramide Inversée, an inverted pyramid structure in the Louvre in Paris, France
 The Inverted Pyramid (novel), by Bertrand Sinclair
 A euphemism for the economic inequality caused by the Dual economy of Cuba, where hospitality workers make more than educated professionals.